Bennettsbridge is a Gaelic Athletic Association club based in Bennettsbridge, County Kilkenny, Ireland. The Bridge last won the Kilkenny Senior Hurling Championship in 1971 and have recently re-gained their senior status.

Achievements
 Kilkenny Senior Hurling Championship 
 Winners - 12 (1890, 1952, 1953, 1955, 1956, 1959, 1960, 1962, 1964, 1966, 1967, 1971.
 Beaten finalists - 6 (1958, 1965, 1968, 1972, 1974, 2018)
 All-Ireland Intermediate Club Hurling Championship 
 Winners 2016
 Leinster Intermediate Club Hurling Championship 
 2015
 Kilkenny Intermediate Hurling Championship 
 Winners 2015
 All-Ireland Junior Club Hurling Championship
 Winners 2015
 Leinster Junior Club Hurling Championship 
Winners 2014 
 Kilkenny Junior Hurling Championship
 Winners 1935, 1948, 1951, 2014
 Kilkenny Minor Hurling Championship
Winners 1947, 1983, 2011 (In 1974 combination of Clara and Bennettsbridge won the title.
 Kilkenny Under-21 Hurling Championship
 Winners 1967, 1985

All Stars
 Jim Treacy
 Paddy Moran
 Liam Simpson
 Noel Skehan
 [ [ Mikey J Lewis Jnr ]]

References

External links
 Official Bennettsbridge GAA Club website

Gaelic games clubs in County Kilkenny
Hurling clubs in County Kilkenny